The Rochdale Herald is a satirical website founded in June 2016. Supposedly based in Rochdale, UK, many of its articles lampoon news stories and public figures from around the world.

On numerous occasions readers have mistaken Herald articles for real news stories, much to the amusement of regular readers. The site's tagline  is "The World's Worst Local Newspaper". In December 2016, Paul Golding, the leader of extreme-right political party Britain First was jailed for eight weeks after breaching a High Court ban on him entering any mosque in England and Wales. The Rochdale Herald was quick to capitalise on this by creating a JustGiving page to raise funds for The Refugee Council, effectively encouraging people to sponsor his jail term to raise money for charity.

See also	
 List of satirical news websites

References

External links
The Rochdale Herald

British satirical websites
Internet properties established in 2016